Curtis Thomas Simmons (May 19, 1929 – December 13, 2022) was an American professional baseball left-handed pitcher, who played in Major League Baseball (MLB) from  to  and  to . Along with right-hander Robin Roberts (a member of the Baseball Hall of Fame), Simmons was one of the twin anchors of the starting rotation of the "Whiz Kids", the Philadelphia Phillies' 1950 National League (NL) championship team. A three-time MLB All-Star, he also played for the St. Louis Cardinals, Chicago Cubs, and California Angels.

Early life and education
Simmons was born in Whitehall Township, Pennsylvania in the Lehigh Valley region of eastern Pennsylvania. He attended Whitehall High School, where he led Whitehall to three straight league titles and also led the Coplay American Legion team to two Pennsylvania state crowns.

Major League Baseball career
In 1947, then Philadelphia Phillies owner Bob Carpenter arranged for an exhibition match between his Phillies and a team of all-star high school players from the Lehigh Valley. The game was played on the opening day of Egypt Memorial Park, June 2, 1947, in front of a crowd of 4,500. Simmons started for the high school team and struck out eleven Phillies as the game ended in a 4–4 tie (a late-game error was the only thing that prevented the high school team from winning). The ,  lefty was signed by the Phillies, and awarded a $65,000 signing bonus (one of the highest ever awarded at that time). That spring, Simmons also pitched and played outfield in an All-American high school game between teams managed by Babe Ruth and Ty Cobb. In 1949, Simmons returned to the Lehigh Valley, pitching for the Phillies in an exhibition match (a game won by a 10–3 margin) against the Allentown Redbirds, in front of a record crowd of 4,590 at Whitehall's Breadon Field.

Simmons won 17 of 25 decisions during the 1950 season, playing a role in bringing Philadelphia its second National League (NL) championship of the 20th century. With the outbreak of the Korean War, however, Simmons was called to active military service in September 1950, with only a month remaining in the campaign. The Phillies managed to hold off the Brooklyn Dodgers in the 1950 season's final contest (on Dick Sisler's 10th-inning home run) to win the NL flag by two games. Simmons was stationed at Camp Atterbury and requested and was granted a leave on October 4, 1950 to attend the Series. The Phillies chose not to request that the Commissioner of Baseball Happy Chandler rule Simmons eligible for the Series, but Simmons chose to attend to support the team. Simmons' place on the Series roster was taken by pitcher Jocko Thompson. Without Simmons, the Phillies were swept in four games by Joe DiMaggio and the New York Yankees.

The team would never again contend for a championship during his tenure there, although Simmons continued to pitch into the late 1950s. In 1964, he appeared in the World Series against the New York Yankees. He started two games in the fall classic for the eventual world champion Cardinals, losing his only decision but compiling a 2.51 ERA.

His final record, over 20 years, was 193–182 (.515). In 569 games pitched and 3,348 innings, Simmons allowed 3,313 hits and 1,063 bases on balls. He recorded 1,697 strikeouts, 163 complete games, 36 shutouts, and five saves. Along with Smoky Burgess, Simmons was the last player to formally retire who had played in MLB in the 1940s (not counting Minnie Miñoso, who would later un-retire, twice). MLB Hall of Fame hitters Hank Aaron and Stan Musial each separately named Simmons as the toughest pitcher they had to face in their careers.

Personal life and death
Simmons died on December 13, 2022, at the age of 93. At the time of his death, Simmons was the last living member of the Phillies in the 1940s, and the last living member of the 1950 Phillies National League pennant winning team.

References

External links

Curt Simmons at SABR (Baseball BioProject)
Curt Simmons at Baseball Almanac
Curt Simmons at Baseballbiography.com

1929 births
2022 deaths
Baseball players from Pennsylvania
California Angels players
Chicago Cubs players
Major League Baseball pitchers
Military personnel from Pennsylvania
National League All-Stars
People from Ambler, Pennsylvania
Sportspeople from Lehigh County, Pennsylvania
Philadelphia Phillies players
St. Louis Cardinals players
Whitehall High School (Pennsylvania) alumni
Williamsport Grays players
Wilmington Blue Rocks (1940–1952) players